Sonata Milušauskaitė (born 31 August 1973 in Prienai, Kaunas) is a Lithuanian race walker.

Achievements

References

External links
 
 
 

1973 births
Living people
Lithuanian female racewalkers
Olympic athletes of Lithuania
Athletes (track and field) at the 1996 Summer Olympics
Athletes (track and field) at the 2000 Summer Olympics
Athletes (track and field) at the 2004 Summer Olympics
Athletes (track and field) at the 2008 Summer Olympics
People from Prienai